Burton is a civil parish in the district of East Staffordshire, Staffordshire, England.  It contains 103 listed buildings that are recorded in the National Heritage List for England.  Of these, one is listed at Grade I, the highest of the three grades, five are at Grade II*, the middle grade, and the others are at Grade II, the lowest grade.  The parish contains the centre and the east part of the town of Burton upon Trent. The listed buildings in the west of the town are included in Listed buildings in Horninglow and Eton.  Most of the listed buildings are houses and associated structures, shops and offices.  The town is a centre of the brewing industry and buildings associated with the industry are listed, some of which have been converted for other uses, including a museum.  Other listed buildings include churches and associated structures, former schools, public houses and hotels, a water tower, courthouses, a market hall, a shelter on a walkway, a bridge, a former head post office, a rifle range, a war memorial, and a former cinema.


Key

Buildings

References

Citations

Sources

Lists of listed buildings in Staffordshire